Byttneria pilosa is a species of flowering plants in the family Malvaceae. It is found in Asia (Bangladesh, Burma, China (Yunnan), India, Laos, Thailand and Vietnam).

References

External links 

 Byttneria pilosa at The Plant List
 Byttneria pilosa at Tropicos

pilosa
Plants described in 1824
Flora of tropical Asia
Flora of Yunnan